Mr. Hiccup is an animated series created by Italtos Corporation in 1983. The character and initial shorts were initially created by Piero Angela and Bruno Bozzetto and developed into 39 three-minute episodes and several dozen shorts. The series focuses on the life of Mr. Hiccup, who is a little man with a normal life, a normal job, a normal home, and one not-so-normal problem: chronic hiccups.

References

External links
 

Italian children's animated comedy television series
Swiss animated television series
Swiss children's television series
1983 television series debuts
1984 television series endings